Qeshlaq-e Anjilavand-e Sofla (also Romanized as Qeshlāq-e Anjīlāvand-e Soflá; also known as Anjīlavand, Anjīlāvand-e Pā’īn, and Anjīlāvand-e Soflá) is a village in Taraznahid Rural District, in the Central District of Saveh County, Markazi Province, Iran. At the 2006 census, its population was 77, in 21 families.

References 

Populated places in Saveh County